João Paulo Silva Martins (born 29 June 1995), known as João Paulo, is a Brazilian footballer who plays for Santos as a goalkeeper.

Club career

Santos

Born in Dourados, Mato Grosso do Sul, João Paulo joined Santos' youth setup in late 2011, after representing Grêmio Sãocarlense, Itaporã (where he was a part of the first team squad at the age of just 16), Grêmio (where he spent just four months) and Sete de Setembro. In 2014, after winning the year's Copa São Paulo de Futebol Júnior, he was promoted to the first team by manager Oswaldo de Oliveira.

In March 2015, after Vanderlei's injury, João Paulo was inscribed in the year's Campeonato Paulista as a third-choice behind Vladimir and Gabriel Gasparotto. In November of that year, he renewed his contract until 2018.

João Paulo made his unofficial first team debut on 8 October 2016, playing the last 20 minutes and saving a penalty in a 1–1 friendly draw against Benfica. On 16 July of the following year, after both Vanderlei and Vladimir were injured, he made his professional – and Série A – debut by starting in a 0–0 away draw against Vasco da Gama.

On 10 October 2017, João Paulo renewed his contract until 2021. He started to appear more regularly during the 2020 season, as Vanderlei left, Vladimir was injured and Everson took a legal action against the club, and renewed his contract until 2025 on 8 September 2020.

João Paulo made his Copa Libertadores debut on 15 September 2020, starting in a 0–0 home draw against Club Olimpia. On 9 November, he and two other teammates tested positive for COVID-19.

On 14 December 2021, João Paulo renewed his contract with Santos until November 2026. The following 28 February, he played his 100th match for the club, a 2–2 home draw against Novorizontino.

On 9 January 2023, João Paulo further extended his contract with Santos until the end of 2027.

Career statistics

References

External links

Santos FC profile 

1995 births
Living people
Sportspeople from Mato Grosso do Sul
Brazilian footballers
Association football goalkeepers
Campeonato Brasileiro Série A players
Santos FC players